Theodore Sanchez de Pina Ramos (17 October 1928 - 11 April 2018) was a Spanish portrait painter who became a naturalised British subject and painted Queen Elizabeth the Queen Mother, Queen Elizabeth II, and the Duke of Edinburgh.

References 

1928 births
2018 deaths
Spanish portrait painters
British portrait painters
Naturalised citizens of the United Kingdom